Jean Bardet (born 22 June 1941, in Paris) is a member of the National Assembly of France. He represents the Val-d'Oise department, and is a member of the Union for a Popular Movement.

References

1941 births
Living people
Politicians from Paris
Rally for the Republic politicians
Union for a Popular Movement politicians
Deputies of the 8th National Assembly of the French Fifth Republic
Deputies of the 10th National Assembly of the French Fifth Republic
Deputies of the 11th National Assembly of the French Fifth Republic
Deputies of the 12th National Assembly of the French Fifth Republic
Deputies of the 13th National Assembly of the French Fifth Republic